The 2008 World Junior Championships in Athletics is the 2008 version of the World Junior Championships in Athletics. It was held in Bydgoszcz in Poland at the Zdzisław Krzyszkowiak Stadium between 8 and 13 July 2008. Previously Bydgoszcz hosted the 1999 World Youth Championships.

The United States topped the medal table with 17 medals overall, including 11 golds, ahead of Germany and Kenya.

Men's results

Track

Field

Women's results

Track

Field

Medal table

Participation
According to an unofficial count through an unofficial result list, 1408 athletes from 165 countries participated in the event.  This is in agreement with the official numbers as published.

References

External links 
 Official results (archive)
  

 
2008
World Junior Championships in Athletics
Athletics
Sport in Bydgoszcz
International athletics competitions hosted by Poland
History of Bydgoszcz